Niceforonia elassodiscus is a species of frog in the family Strabomantidae found in Colombia and Ecuador.
Its natural habitat is subtropical or tropical moist montane forests.
It is threatened by habitat loss.

References

elassodiscus
Amphibians of the Andes
Amphibians of Colombia
Amphibians of Ecuador
Taxonomy articles created by Polbot
Amphibians described in 1973